DJ Colin Francis (born 16 January 1976), is an English DJ and record producer from Essex, specialising in dance, hip-hop, pop and R&B.

In November 2015, Colin Francis supported 50 Cent as his opening act for a three city UK Tour.

Biography 
Based in London, Colin Francis plays weekly in London's West End Clubs, as well as regular events in Essex and across the UK such as for Lavish and Unique Parties. During the summer he hosts and DJs at various venues in the UK and Marbella.

Colin also performed in V Festival 2015's Lovejuice VIP Area alongside Sammy Porter and Tinie Tempah's DJ Charlesy.

Education and background 
During his early career Colin went to UEL and obtained a B.A (hons) Degree in Economics and Politics. While studying for his degree, Colin was working in promotions and marketing at RCA/BMG record company to gain experience within the Music Industry. During the holidays he supports the local community/youth centres teaching young people how to DJ.

Colin rose to fame through regular performances and also to the success of his mix compilations, "No Carbs Before Marbs", and "50 Shades of Summer" which laid the foundation for his future collaborative releases with Ministry of Sound and the establishment of the Colin Francis Project.

Ministry of Sound 
In 2013 Colin Francis signed a distribution deal with Ministry of Sound and he produced/compiled/mixed the nationally advertised No.1 Compilation Album "MARBELLA SESSIONS 2013" a compilation of the year's hottest summer party anthems, including many original mixes, exclusive recordings, and some of Colin's own musical projects. The album was No.1 on the iTunes Chart for 5 weeks, and became Ministry of Sound's biggest-ever Week 1 digital sales album. Building on the Marbella Sessions 2013 success, Colin has gone on to release two more annual Marbella Sessions compilation albums.

On 2 February 2015, Colin released VIP a Hip-Hop and R&B double CD compilation with Ministry of Sound, which prompted the release of VIP Vol II 11 September 2015. To date, Colin has released five albums with Ministry of Sound, all of which have hit the No. 1 spot on iTunes Dance Album download charts.

Colin Francis Project 
The Colin Francis Project is an independent record label founded by Colin to release his remixes, original productions and collaborations, some of which have made it into the Ministry of Sound compilation series. In November 2014 Colin Francis released a remix of "Creeping in the Dark", a popular House anthem, with critically acclaimed producer Zinc which was well received with support from many DJ's including Radio 1's DJ Zane Lowe. On 10 April 2015 Colin also released Journey an independent album release in collaboration with The Zoooo Records.
 Colin Francis Project - Journey – The Zoooo Records – Released: 10 April 2015
 Layla Grey – Let you Go (appears Marbella Sessions 2014, VIP) – Released: 2 June 2014
 Lisa S – Show Me Love 2015 (appears Marbella Sessions 2015) – Released: 25 May 2015

Discography 
 Marbella Sessions 2013 – Ministry of Sound – Released: 2 June 2013
 Marbella Sessions 2014 – Ministry of Sound – Released: 2 June 2014
 Marbella Sessions 2015 – Ministry of Sound – Released: 25 May 2015
 VIP – Ministry of Sound (2CD) – Released: 2 February 2015
 VIP, Vol. II – Ministry of Sound (2CD) – Released: 11 September 2015
 Marbella Collection 2016 – Ministry of Sound – Released: 24 June 2016

References

External links 
 DJ Colin Francis – Official Website
 

1976 births
Living people
English record producers
DJs from London
Black British DJs
Musicians from Essex